This is a list of cathedrals in England and the Crown Dependencies of the Isle of Man, Gibraltar and those in the Channel Islands, by country. Former and intended cathedrals are listed separately.

A cathedral church is a Christian place of worship that is the chief, or "mother" church of a diocese and is distinguished as such by being the location for the cathedra or bishop's seat.  In the strictest sense, only those Christian denominations with an episcopal hierarchy possess cathedrals. However the label 'cathedral' remains in common parlance for notable churches that were formerly part of an episcopal denomination.

It is a common misconception that the term "cathedral" may be applied to any particularly large or grand church.  Whilst many cathedrals may be such, this is due to their ecclesiastical status. Such a church is grand because it is a cathedral, rather than it being designated a cathedral because of its grandeur.  A cathedral may in fact be a relatively small building, particularly where they exist in sparser or poorer communities.  Modern cathedrals frequently lack the grandeur of those of the Medieval and Renaissance times, having more focus on the functional aspect of a place of worship. However, many of the grand and ancient cathedrals that remain today were originally built to much smaller plans, and have been successively extended and rebuilt over the centuries.

Some cathedrals were purpose-built as such.  Some were formerly abbeys or priories, whilst others were parochial, or parish churches, subsequently promoted in status due to ecclesiastical requirements such as periodic diocesan reorganisation.

Contents of this list

The following list comprises, for England and its dependencies, all locations of current cathedral churches, or former cathedral churches, including those locations where no trace remains of the structure, indeed where the precise location is no longer known.

Also included are those structures or sites of intended cathedrals as well as pro-cathedrals, which are churches serving as an interim cathedral, (for instance whilst a permanent cathedral is acquired), or as a co-cathedral where the diocesan demographics/geography require the bishop's seat to be shared with a building in another location.

The inclusion of dependencies is strictly for ecclesiastical reasons—the included dependencies are those that share a province with the mainland of England.

<li style="display: inline-table;">

<li style="display: inline-table;">

England and dependencies

Church of England

Province of Canterbury

Province of York

Catholic Church

Latin Church

Province of Westminster

Province of Birmingham

Province of Liverpool

Province of Southwark

Bishopric of the Forces

Diocese of Gibraltar

Personal Ordinariate of Our Lady of Walsingham
N.B. The Personal Ordinariate of Our Lady of Walsingham, a diocese-like structure under canon law, is currently headed by a married man, who is therefore an ordinary but not a bishop; hence the central church of the Ordinariate is not technically a cathedral. However, it will be a cathedral whenever the ordinary is a bishop. It is therefore included here. The Cathedral of Our Lady of Walsingham (Houston) is in the same position.

Ukrainian Greek Catholic Church

Eparchy of the Holy Family of London

Syro-Malabar Catholic Church

Eparchy of Great Britain

Eastern and Oriental Orthodox Churches

Antiochian Orthodox Church

Coptic Orthodox Church

Greek Orthodox Church

Russian Orthodox Church

Syriac Orthodox Church

Ukrainian Autocephalous Orthodox Church

Georgian Orthodox Church

Other churches

Anglican Catholic Church

Holy Catholic Church (Western Rite)

Liberal Catholic Church
Liberal Catholic Church is term that covers groups within the Independent Catholicism movement.

See also
 Lists of cathedrals – lists by country
 List of cathedrals in Ireland
 List of cathedrals in Scotland
 List of cathedrals in Wales
 List of abbeys and priories in the United Kingdom
 List of abbeys and priories in the Republic of Ireland
 List of tallest church buildings
 Architecture of the medieval cathedrals of England
 Religion in the United Kingdom
 Parish Church of St Helier (Pro-Cathedral of the Channel Islands)
 List of former cathedrals in Great Britain
 Minster

Footnotes

Citations

References

 Edwards, David L. (1989) The Cathedrals of Britain. Norwich: Pitkin Pictorials 
 Fawcett, Richard (1997) Scottish Cathedrals. London: B. T. Batsford / Historic Scotland
 Galloway, Peter (2000) The Cathedrals of Scotland. Dalkeith: Scottish Cultural Press 
 
 New, Anthony S. B. (1972) The Observer's Book of Cathedrals. London: Frederick Warne & Co.
 Pepin, David (1994) Discovering Cathedrals. Aylesbury: Shire Publications 
 Platten, Stephen (1999) Cathedrals & Abbeys of England. Norwich: Jarrold 
 Thorold, Henry (1986) Collins Guide To Cathedrals, Abbeys and Priories of England and Wales. London: Collins 
 BBC (2012) England's lesser-known Cathedrals. http://www.bbc.co.uk/religion/0/19077358

External links
 

England, Cathedrals
 Cathedrals